James George Wills (21 October 1914 – 14 May 2007) was an Australian rules footballer who played with Geelong in the Victorian Football League (VFL).

Recruited from Geelong West, Wills played 16 senior games in 1937, his debut season. He was a half forward flanker in the 1937 VFL Grand Final and had 18 kicks in a winning team. He managed just 10 further appearances over the next three years, not featuring at all in the 1939 VFL season. In 1941 he enlisted with the Royal Australian Armoured Corps and served overseas during World War II.

References

External links

1914 births
2007 deaths
Australian rules footballers from Victoria (Australia)
Geelong Football Club players
Geelong Football Club Premiership players
Geelong West Football Club players
Australian military personnel of World War II
One-time VFL/AFL Premiership players